Else Skogan is a former Norwegian curler.

At the national level, she is a Norwegian women's champion curler (1985) and mixed champion curler (2000).

Teams

Women's

Mixed

References

External links
 

The Dream Team takes on the world | Maclean's | APRIL 18, 1983

Living people
Norwegian female curlers
Norwegian curling champions
Year of birth missing (living people)
Place of birth missing (living people)